Don't Touch the White Woman! is a 1974 Western comedy film co-written and directed by Marco Ferreri.

Plot
A fictionalized version of Custer's Last Stand, set at a real building site in Paris, France. Marcello Mastroianni stars as General George Armstrong Custer. Buffalo Bill Cody (Michel Piccoli) portrays a charlatan media impresario. Ugo Tognazzi gives a fictional portrayal of Mitch Bouyer, one of Custer's Native American scouts, who runs a business selling Native artifacts made in sweatshops by white women. Alain Cuny plays Sitting Bull who must defend his people when their apartment building homes are destroyed by the Union Cavalry. The film climaxes with the Battle of the Little Bighorn held in a large construction excavation where Les Halles market once was.

Cast
 Catherine Deneuve as Marie-Hélène de Boismonfrais
 Marcello Mastroianni as George A. Custer
 Michel Piccoli as Buffalo Bill
 Philippe Noiret as Gen. Terry
 Ugo Tognazzi as Mitch
 Alain Cuny as Sitting Bull
 Serge Reggiani as The Mad Indian
 Darry Cowl as Major Archibald
 Monique Chaumette as Sister Lucie
 Daniele Dublino asdaughter
 Henri Piccoli as Sitting Bull's father
 Franca Bettoia as Rayon de Lune (as Franca Bettoja)
 Paolo Villaggio as CIA agent
 Franco Fabrizi as Tom (as Franco Fabrizzi)
 Laurente Vedres as (as Vedres et Boutang)

See also
 Mr. Freedom
 Blazing Saddles
 Revisionist Western
 Cultural depictions of George Armstrong Custer

References

External links
 
 
 

1974 films
1974 comedy films
1970s French films
1970s French-language films
1970s Italian films
1970s parody films
1970s satirical films
1970s Western (genre) comedy films
Cultural depictions of Buffalo Bill
Cultural depictions of George Armstrong Custer
Cultural depictions of Sitting Bull
Films directed by Marco Ferreri
Films produced by Alain Sarde
Films scored by Philippe Sarde
Films set in Paris
Films shot in Paris
Films with screenplays by Rafael Azcona
French parody films
French satirical films
French Western (genre) comedy films
French-language Italian films
Italian parody films
Italian satirical films
Italian Western (genre) comedy films
Spaghetti Western films